Freedom Township is the name of some places in the U.S. state of Pennsylvania:
Freedom Township, Adams County, Pennsylvania
Freedom Township, Blair County, Pennsylvania

Pennsylvania township disambiguation pages